Estlund is a surname. Notable people with the surname include:

Christy Rowe Estlund (born 1973), American soccer player 
Cynthia Estlund (born 1957), American legal scholar
David Estlund, American philosopher